Opor Praput or Praput Pimpama is a Thai guitarist, singer and songwriter. He is known as the one of The Voice Thailand Season 2 competitors.

Early life

He was born on 28 August 1987 and raised in Loei, Thailand. He is the only child in a family and grew up with parents’ 1970s music, inspiring him to learn singing and playing guitar. After his secondary school, Opor Praput moved to Bangkok to further his education and became a musician with his own band.

The genre of music he loves is the modern pop with singers such as John Mayer, Jamie Cullum, Joe Satriani, Mr. Big and Thai-band Silly Fools.

The Voice Thailand

He competed on The Voice Thailand Season 2 in 2013 from September to November.

Career

Others 

 Voted as The Online's Heartthrob Bachelor by The Klinique for Cleo 50 Most Eligible Bachelors 2015 
 Actor for the first short film of Cleo Thailand magazine "The 50 Last Dates" 
 DJ at 88.5 E-D-S Everyday Station from Monday to Friday at 08.00–10.00 hrs.

References

External links

Post Today, 6 July 2015
Student Weekly
 
 
 Praput Pimpama on You Tube 
 88.5 E-D-S Good Happening

Praput Pimpama
Praput Pimpama
Praput Pimpama
Living people
1987 births